Claire Keefer (born 5 May 1995) is a short stature athlete from Australia. She represented Australia at the 2016 Rio Paralympics in athletics where she won a bronze medal. She has won a silver and bronze medal at the World Para Athletics Championships.

Personal
She was born on 5 May 1995 with achondroplasia and is a person of short stature. Her parents Lindsay and Sue Keefer live in Withcott, Queensland. She attended St Ursula College in Toowoomba. She lives mostly in Withcott, Queensland. She works part-time as a child care worker.

Career
Keefer competes in the F41 classification and started athletics in 2009. She was ineligible to compete at the 2012 London Paralympics due to being under 18. In the F41 classicification the only athletics events for women are the discus throw and shot put. in 2015, Keefer won the silver medal in discus and bronze medal in shot put at an IPC Grand Prix meet in Dubai.

At the 2015 IPC Athletics World Championships in Doha, she won the bronze medal in the Women's Shot Put F41 with a national record throw of 7.62m. She finished fourth in the Women's Discus F41. She has received financial assistance from Aim For the Stars Foundation, the Layne Beachley Foundation.
She visits the Queensland Academy of Sport in Brisbane four times per week to undertake technical coaching. Her philosophy is "Strength in size".

She won a bronze medal at the 2016 Rio Paralympics in the Women's Shout Put F41 with a throw of 8.16 m.

At the 2017 World Para Athletics Championships in London, England, she won the silver medal in the Women's Shot Put F41 with a throw of 8.44m. At the 2019 World Para Athletics Championships in Dubai, she threw the shot put 9.19 to win the bronze medal Women's Shot Put F41. 

Keefer announced her retirement from competition in April 2021.

References

External links
 
 
 Claire Keefer at Athletics Australia
 Claire Keefer at Australian Athletics Historical Results

1995 births
Living people
Australian female discus throwers
Australian female shot putters
Paralympic athletes of Australia
Paralympic bronze medalists for Australia
Paralympic medalists in athletics (track and field)
Athletes (track and field) at the 2016 Summer Paralympics
Medalists at the 2016 Summer Paralympics
Competitors in athletics with dwarfism
Female competitors in athletics with disabilities
Sportswomen from Queensland
Sportspeople from Toowoomba
Athletes (track and field) at the 2020 Summer Paralympics
21st-century Australian women